This is a list of varieties or cultivars of cucumber, a widely cultivated vine in the gourd family, Cucurbitaceae. The cucumber vine bears edible fruit.

Varieties

References 

Cucumber
Cucumber